The Baltimore Claws were an American basketball team which was supposed to appear in the 1975–76 season in the American Basketball Association.  The team collapsed before the season started, playing only three exhibition games, all losses, in its brief history.

Background

The team that eventually became the Baltimore Claws had earlier competed in the ABA as the New Orleans Buccaneers from 1967 through 1970, as the Memphis Pros from 1970 through 1972, as the Memphis Tams from 1972 through 1974 and as the Memphis Sounds during the 1974–75 season.  The Memphis franchise had struggled through the years and in its last season there it had relied on the league itself to handle some of its bills.  The Sounds began the 1974–75 season with a win followed by several losses; fan interest waned but the team rallied to finish in fourth place in the ABA's Eastern Division.  In the playoffs they lost in the Eastern Division semifinals to the eventual league champion Kentucky Colonels, 4 games to 1.  Of the Sounds' draft picks that season, two (Lonnie Shelton and Terry Furlow) remained in college and the third (Rich Kelley) signed with the NBA's New Orleans Jazz.  At the close of the 1974–75 season league commissioner Tedd Munchak issued an ultimatum to the Sounds if they wanted to stay in Memphis: sell 4,000 season tickets, line up new investors and get a better lease at the Mid-South Coliseum.  When none of the conditions were met, the league took control of the franchise and put it on the market.

Relocation to Maryland

Prior to the 1975–76 season, a consortium of seven Maryland businessmen led by David Cohan bought the troubled Sounds for $1 million and relocated it to Baltimore. In August 1975, new ABA Commissioner Dave DeBusschere suddenly awarded the franchise to another group in Memphis due to apparent financial problems involving the Baltimore owners. The Memphis group backed out the very next day, and the franchise reverted to Baltimore after the Cohan-led group made a $250,000 down payment.

The team was initially named the Baltimore Hustlers, but league and public pressure forced them to rename it the Claws.

Personnel
In September the Claws gained attention early by gaining the rights to superstar Dan Issel of the reigning ABA champion Kentucky Colonels. The Colonels were supposed to receive center Tom Owens and $500,000 in cash for Issel, but the $500,000 never arrived. When Colonels owner John Y. Brown, Jr. found out the money hadn't arrived, he stormed into a Claws board meeting and announced Issel was being sold to the Denver Nuggets. To make the move look like a trade between Denver and Baltimore, the Nuggets sent forward Dave Robisch to the Claws. The Claws' owners protested, claiming that three more players should have come to Baltimore in the trade. They threatened to fold the team if the other players didn't arrive, but the league ruled against them. The Claws then sent another good player, Rick Mount, to the Utah Stars in another trade.

The Claws entered the preseason under coach Joe Mullaney with a roster that included Mel Daniels and Stew Johnson. The Claws also suited up guard Skip Wise, who the previous year was the first freshman to make the Atlantic Coast Conference all-conference first team. But Wise (a native of Baltimore) chose not to return to Clemson for his sophomore year, instead signing a five-year, $700,000 no-cut contract with the Claws.

Games
The Baltimore Claws played only three games in their history, all preseason exhibitions. The first was on October 9, 1975 in Salisbury, Maryland, against the Virginia Squires. The Squires won 131–121; attendance was reported at 1,150.

Two days later the Claws lost to the NBA's Philadelphia 76ers 103–82 in Cherry Hill, New Jersey, in front of a capacity crowd of 1,213 at East High School.

On October 16, 1975, the Claws played the Squires again, this time at Knott Arena, Mt. St. Mary's College, Emmitsburg, Maryland. Virginia won again, 100–88, in front of approximately 500 spectators.

Continuing problems

Due to mounting financial problems, the second loss to the Squires ended up being the Claws' final game. Players and coaches were going unpaid and not even getting their per diem meal money. Only 300 season tickets had been sold. The players were still wearing old red Sounds uniforms with a green patch placed on it saying "Claws", along with unaltered red Sounds warmups. Their practice T-shirts had rips under the arms.

On October 16, 1975, ABA Commissioner DeBusschere got word that one of the Claws' banks had yanked its line of credit. DeBusschere responded with an ultimatum: deposit $500,000 with the league as a "performance bond" within four days to cover expenses or be shut down. The Claws got together half of the money but could not raise the rest. Reportedly, the remaining money, plus an additional $70,000, was being held in escrow by the city, to be released only if Cohan resigned.

The ABA disbanded the Claws on October 20, 1975, less than a week before the regular season began. The league issued a statement noting that it had been prepared to enter the 1975–76 season with "nine solid teams." League officials added that the Claws' backers had been unable to get their affairs in order despite being given extra time to do so. The Claws' office at the Baltimore Civic Center was padlocked by arena management due to unpaid bills. (Incredibly, the Claws were just one of four Baltimore "major league" franchises that vanished in 1975, the others being the Baltimore Banners of World Team Tennis, who folded in February; the Baltimore Blades of the World Hockey Association; and finally the North American Soccer League's Baltimore Comets, who shifted to San Diego just a few days before the Claws officially folded.)

The Claws threatened to seek an injunction delaying the start of the season until Baltimore were reinstated, citing a provision in the rules requiring ten days notice before any team could be shuttered. However, after both the ABA and the city threatened to file their own legal actions, the Claws quietly folded; the league felt the ten-day rule was trumped by a larger obligation to ensure that its franchises were being run in a professional manner.

Dissolution

The Claws players were put into a dispersal draft. Dave Robisch and Paul Ruffner ended up going to the Spirits of St. Louis. Stew Johnson was sent to the San Diego Sails (who also folded, just a few weeks later). Claude Terry was sent to the Denver Nuggets. Chuck Williams was sent to the Virginia Squires. Scott English was sent to the Indiana Pacers. Joe Hamilton was sent to the Utah Stars. George Carter also ended up with the Stars despite not being picked in the dispersal draft; Utah would become the ABA's third casualty of the season, suspending operations in early December. The Claws' best known player, Mel Daniels, was disappointed at the Claws' fate and retired rather than play for another team. In Terry Pluto's book on the ABA, "Loose Balls", Daniels recalled that the Claws' players were allowed to take equipment and furniture from the team office in lieu of payment.

Aftermath
The league's assertion that they had "nine solid teams" quickly proved to be incorrect, as both the San Diego Sails and the Utah Stars ceased operations early in the season. The wobbly Virginia Squires franchise did manage to finish the 1975-76 campaign, but with an awful 15–68 record played in front of small crowds; they too folded, leaving the ABA with only six teams. Finally, the ABA would merge with the NBA in the summer of 1976.

See also

Ottawa Civics - World Hockey Association franchise that lasted for approximately two weeks and played only seven games.

References

External links 
 Remember the ABA Baltimore Claws page
 January 1976 column by Dan Pattison on demise of the Claws and other teams and the impact on the ABA
 Baltimore Claws fan memories

 
American Basketball Association teams
1975 in sports in Maryland
1975 establishments in Maryland
1975 disestablishments in Maryland
Basketball teams established in 1975
Basketball teams disestablished in 1975
Basketball teams in Maryland
Defunct basketball teams in the United States

de:Memphis Sounds